The women's 60 metres hurdles event at the 2013 European Athletics Indoor Championships was held on 1 March 2013 at 11:30 (round 1), 18:20 (semi-final) and 19:55 (final) local time.

Records

Results

Round 1 
Qualification: First 4 (Q) or and the 4 fastest athletes (q) advanced to the final.

Semi-final 
Qualification: First 4 (Q) advanced to the final.

Final 
The final was held at 19:55.

References 

60 metres hurdles at the European Athletics Indoor Championships
2013 European Athletics Indoor Championships
2013 in women's athletics